Jorge Washington Ladines Garcés (born September 21, 1986) is an Ecuadorian footballer. He currently plays for Barcelona Sporting Club in the Campeonato Ecuatoriano de Fútbol.

Club career
Ladines has played for Emelec for his entire career. He has scored very important goals for his team and is a key player in the squad.

On January 12, Ladines ended his tenure with Emelec and signed with El Nacional.

International career
He received his first international call up for Ecuador for a September 2007 friendly against El Salvador, which Ecuador won easily 5–1. He also was included in the squad that began the 2010 World Cup qualifying campaign.

External links

1986 births
Living people
Sportspeople from Guayaquil
Association football wingers
Ecuadorian footballers
Ecuador international footballers
C.S. Emelec footballers
C.D. El Nacional footballers
C.D. Cuenca footballers
Barcelona S.C. footballers
Ecuadorian Serie A players